The Ultima GTR is a super car manufactured by Ultima Sports Ltd of Hinckley, Leicestershire, England, and described by commentators as a supercar.  The car was available both in kit form and as a "turnkey" (i.e. assembled by the factory) vehicle until early 2015, when it was replaced by the Ultima Evolution. The design is mid engined, rear wheel drive layout, with a tubular steel space frame chassis and GRP bodywork.  A convertible version called the Ultima Can-Am was also produced. Kit builders were free to source and fit a variety of engines and transmissions but the Chevrolet small block V8 supplied by American Speed mated to either a Porsche or Getrag transaxle was the factory recommended standard, and this configuration was fitted to all turnkey cars.

Performance 

As a result, they established the following official, independently verified records for a production car equipped with road tyres and exhaust:

Fastest 0– time: 2.6 seconds
Fastest 0– time: 5.3 seconds
Fastest – time: 1.8 seconds
Fastest  to 0 mph braking: 3.6 seconds
Fastest 0 –  – 0 mph time: 9.4 seconds
Best performance on a skidpad: 1.176g lateral grip in a  circle.
Fastest road car over the 1/4 mile: 9.9 seconds @ 

There are also other model designations for the kits, including the GTR 660 and GTR 730.

The GTR720 was independently timed lapping the Top Gear test track in 1 minute 12.8 seconds, which is at least 1 second faster than all other times listed on the Top Gear television programme's Power Board. In October 2009 Ultima set another time of 1 minute 9.9 seconds, but this time in a configuration not suitable for use on public highways. Ultima have been keen to point out that this time is faster than those set by both the Ferrari FXX and the Caparo T1; of which neither were deemed to be acceptable road cars by the Top Gear presenters shortly after these times were set.

In 2011, Romanian workshop Black Falcon Cars mated an Ultima GTR chassis and a modified Porsche GT3 transmission with a Chevrolet V8 turbocharged by Nelson Racing Engines to achieve  on racing fuel and made it fully road legal under the brand name Black Falcon SBC-TT1750.

In 2015 the GTR and Can-Am names were retired and replaced by the Ultima Evolution range, which represents a complete reengineering of the package.

Notes

External links 

 Ultima Sports Ltd.
 Details on the record-breaking 0-100-0 test
 MacG Racing - A British team racing the Ultima GTR in Britcar and elsewhere

Rear mid-engine, rear-wheel-drive vehicles
Sports cars
2000s cars
Ultima vehicles
Cars introduced in 1999